This list of plesiosaur type specimens is a list of fossils serving as the official standard-bearers for inclusion in the species and genera of the reptile clade Plesiosauria, which includes the short-necked pliosaurs and long necked plesiosauroids. Type specimens are those which are definitionally members of biological taxa and additional specimens can only be "referred" to these taxa if an expert deems them sufficiently similar to the type.

The list

References

http://plesiosauria.com/final_thesis/10_appendices.pdf

Mesozoic fossil record
Specimens